2004 in men's road cycling is about the 2004  men's bicycle races governed by the UCI.

World championships
The World Road championships were held in Verona, Italy.

Grand Tours

UCI Coupe du Monde

2.HC Category races
The prefix 2 indicates that these events are stage races.

1.HC Category races
The prefix 1 indicates that these events are one-day races.

2.1 Category races
The prefix 2 indicates that these events are stage races.

1.1 Category races
The prefix 1 indicates that these events are one-day races.

National Championships

See also
 2004 in women's road cycling

 
2004